L'Isle-en-Rigault (before 2017: Lisle-en-Rigault) is a commune in the Meuse department in Grand Est in north-eastern France.

See also
Communes of the Meuse department

References

Isleenrigault